The Archbishop of Ohrid is a historic title given to the primate of the Archbishopric of Ohrid. The whole original title of the primate was Archbishop of Justiniana Prima and all Bulgaria.

The archbishopric was established in 1018 by lowering of the rank of the autocephalous Bulgarian Patriarchate to the rank of archbishopric. The autocephaly of the Ohrid Archbishopric remained respected during the periods of Byzantine, Bulgarian, Serbian and Ottoman rule and continued to exist until its abolition in 1767.

Today, the primates of the Macedonian Orthodox Church and Orthodox Ohrid Archbishopric are both claimants to the title of Archbishop of Ohrid. According to the statutes of the Bulgarian Orthodox Church, the current Bulgarian Patriarchate is the successor of the Ohrid Archbishopric.

Archbishopric of Ohrid, 1018–1767

Macedonian Orthodox Church

Macedonian Orthodox Church (autonomous), 1958–1967
On 4 October 1958, the Macedonian Orthodox Church was declared as the restoration of the Archbishopric of Ohrid. Archbishop Dositej II was enthroned as Archbishop of Ohrid and Macedonia, continuing in the lineage of the Archbishops of Ohrid. The declaration was retroactively accepted by the Bishops' Council of the Serbian Orthodox Church on 19 June 1959, and was celebrated in a common liturgy by Archbishop Dositej II and Serbian Patriarch German in Skopje.

In 1962, Serbian Patriarch German and Russian Patriarch Alexy I visited the Macedonian Orthodox Church on the feast of Ss. Cyril and Methodius in Ohrid. The two patriarchs and the Macedonian archbishop celebrated Holy Liturgy marking the first occasion where the leader of the Macedonian church met with heads of other Eastern Orthodox Churches.

Macedonian Orthodox Church (self-proclaimed autocephalous), 1967-2022

On 19 July 1967, in Ohrid, the Macedonian Orthodox Church declared autocephaly from the Serbian Orthodox Church, a move which was not acknowledged by the Serbian church and other Eastern Orthodox Churches.

Macedonian Orthodox Church (autocephalous), since 2022

On 2022, the disagreement between the Macedonian Orthodox Church and the Serbian Orthodox Church over the self-proclaimed autocephaly of the former ended. The Macedonian Orthodox Church was recognized as autocephalous by the Ecumenical Patriarchate and some other Eastern Orthodox churches. Archbishop Stefan became the first to be canonically recognized as Archbishop of Ohrid of the Macedonian Orthodox Church since Dositej II after the end of the dispute.

Serbian Orthodox Church

Orthodox Ohrid Archbishopric (autonomous), since 2005

The Serbian Orthodox Church had a disagreement with the Macedonian Orthodox Church after its separation and declaration of autocephaly in 1967 and did not recognize it, along with all of the other Eastern Orthodox churches. After the negotiations between the two churches were suspended, the Macedonian church had withdrawn from the 2002 agreement where the Macedonian church would enjoy recognition as autonomous under the control of the Serbian church, the Serbian church officially recognized the group led by Jovan Vraniškovski, a former bishop of the Macedonian church, as leaders of the Archbishopric of Ohrid under the tutelage of the Serbian Patriarchate in 2005. The Serbian church recognized his group as the restoration of the Archbishopric of Ohrid and gave him the title of Jovan VI, Archbishop of Ohrid.

References 

 
Serbian Orthodox Church
Bulgarian Orthodox Church
Macedonian Orthodox Church
Ohrid
Ohrid